The Sanremo Music Festival 2008 was the 58th Sanremo Music Festival, held at the Teatro Ariston in Sanremo. The first and the second night of the show were held on 25 and 26 February 2008, while the last three nights were held from 28 February and 1 March 2008.

The contest, broadcast by Rai 1, was presented by Pippo Baudo and Piero Chiambretti with Bianca Guaccero and Andrea Osvárt. The competition included two different sections. The "Big Artists" section, starring twenty established singers, was won by the duo composed of Giò Di Tonno and Lola Ponce with the song "Colpo di fulmine", while the newcomers' section, featuring 14 debuting or little known artists, was won by Sonohra's "L'amore".

The show received poor ratings compared to those of the previous years. All of the five nights of the show were watched by less than 10,000,000 people, the worst result in the contest's history.

Presenters and personnel

In June 2007, RAI vice director Giancarlo Leone officially announced Pippo Baudo and Piero Chiambretti as the presenters of the Sanremo Music Festival, also confirming Baudo as the artistic director of the show. It was Baudo's thirteenth Sanremo Music Festival as the presenter of the competition. 
Italian actress Bianca Guaccero and Hungarian fashion model and actress Andrea Osvárt were later selected as the co-presenters of the show.

Gaetano Castelli was the creator of the scenography for the fifteenth time, while theatre director Gino Landi, assisted by Massimo Fusi, was chosen as the director and choreographer of the show for the sixth time. The Sanremo Festival Orchestra was directed by Pippo Caruso.

Nights

First night
During the first night of the competition, held on 25 February 2008, ten out of twenty acts competing in the Big Artists section performed their songs. They were voted by a jury composed of 1,000 people, 20 in each different region of Italy. The awarded points were not revealed, but they contributed to determine the final result of the competition. Additionally, 5 acts composing the Newcomers' section sang their entries and were voted by the same jury. The detailed ranking was not revealed, but the three acts receiving the fewest votes were eliminated from the competition.

Performances
Key:
 – Contestant competing in the "Big Artists" section.
 – Contestant competing in the "Newcomer Artists" section.

Guests and other performances
 The first performance of the night was Gianni Morandi's cover version of Domenico Modugno's "Nel blu dipinto di blu", better known as "Volare", which won the Sanremo Music Festival in 1958.
 At the beginning of the night, the cast of the Italian version of the musical theatre stage work High School Musical performed the song "Insieme", Italian adaptation of "Together".
 Italian comedians Carlo Verdone and Geppi Cucciari appeared during the night, playing the roles of the characters of the film Grande, grosso e Verdone.
 American singer Lenny Kravitz performed his single "I'll Be Waiting". At the end of his performance, he also joked with Chiambretti, asking Baudo to play the song "Donna Rosa", written by Baudo himself.

Second night
The second night of the competition was held on 26 February 2008, with the same rules of the preceding one. The ten "Big Artists" which didn't perform on the first night, sang their entries for the first time and were voted by a brand new jury, composed of 1,000 people, 20 in each different region of Italy. As for the first night, the awarded points were not revealed, but they contributed to determine the final result of the competition. The last five acts composing the Newcomers' section also performed their songs, being voted by the same jury. Although the complete ranking was not revealed, the three acts receiving the fewer votes were eliminated from the competition.

Performances
Key:
 – Contestant competing in the "Big Artists" section.
 – Contestant competing in the "Newcomer Artists" section.

Notes

A  Loredana Bertè was disqualified from the competition after her performance, because it was revealed that "Musica e parole" was actually a cover of Ornella Ventura's "L'ultimo segreto", released in 1988, while the rules of the competition state that competing song cannot be released or publicly performed before the beginning of the Festival. Bertè changed only some lyrics of the song, claiming she thought it was never released before. Despite her elimination, Bertè was allowed to perform again during the Sanremo Music Festival.

Guests and other performances
 English new wave band Duran Duran performed the song "Falling Down" during the night.
 The Seleçao Sacerdoti, a non-profit football team composed of Catholic priests, appeared during the TV program, also performing a Latin-language version of Queen's "We Are the Champions".

Third night
During the third night, held on 28 February 2008, each contestant of the Big Artists section performed the competing song with a guest. No artist from the Newcomers' section performed during the night. Each performance was voted by a jury of 1,000 people, as in the previous two nights. Public votes were also introduced during the third night. No details about the rankings were revealed and no one of the competing acts was eliminated, but the collected votes contributed to determine the winner of the competition, during the final night held on 1 May 2008.

Performances

Guests and other performances
 Loredana Bertè, after being disqualified from the competition, was allowed to perform her song "Musica e parole" in a duet with Ivana Spagna, as previously planned. Their performance open the show.
 Franco-Israeli singer-songwriter Yael Naim performed her single "New Soul".
 American pianist and child prodigy of Chinese origins, Marc Yu, played "Flight of the Bumblebee" from Nikolai Rimsky-Korsakov's opera The Tale of Tsar Saltan. He also played some verses from Pippo Baudo's song "Donna Rosa".

Fourth night
During the fourth night, the eight remaining artists competing in the Newcomers' section performed their entries. Each act was voted by a "Quality jury", composed of celebrities, and by televotes. The "Quality jury" was composed of actors Nicolas Vaporidis and Sarah Felberbaum, music producer and talent scout Claudio Cecchetto, swimmer Alessia Filippi and writer Federico Moccia. At the end of the night, the duo Sonohra was announced the winner of the competition. The artists competing in the "Big Artists" section didn't appear during the night. Several other established Italian artists were invited to perform as guests, including Jovanotti, Giorgia and Fiorella Mannoia.

Performances

Guests and other performances
 Italian singer Giorgia was the first guest artist of the night. She performed George Gershwin's "The Man I Love", Luigi Tenco's "Se stasera sono qui" and her single "La La Song".
 Rapper and singer Jovanotti performed his single "Fango". American singer-songwriter and musician Ben Harper played guitar during his performance. Harper also performed "Lifeline", with Jovanotti appearing as a backing vocalist. Finally, Jovanotti sang his hit single "A te".
 Fiorella Mannoia sang cover versions of Sergio Endrigo's "Io che amo solo te" and Vasco Rossi's "Sally", as well as her 1987 hit single "Quello che le donne non dicono".
 British singer Leona Lewis performed the single "Bleeding Love".
 Gianni Morandi performed his songs "Stringimi le mani" and "Uno su mille", as well as José Feliciano and Ricchi e Poveri's "Che sarà". 
 Italian band Pooh performed a medley of their past hits "Amici per sempre", "Pensiero", "Tanta voglia di lei", "Chi fermerà la musica", "Dimmi di sì" and "Uomini soli". Pooh also performed the single "La casa del sole".
 Italian pianist Nicola Piovani played the songs "Il pianino delle meraviglie", "La vita è bella" and "Quanto t'ho amato".
 At the end of the night, Loredana Bertè and Ivana Spagna performed once again the song "Musica e parole", ejected from the competition after the first performance. Pippo Baudo also gave to Loredana Bertè the prize which was assigned in 1982 to her sister, Mia Martini, for the song "E non finisce mica il cielo". It was the very first Critics' Award, but Mia Martini, who died in 1995, never received it.

Fifth night
During the fifth night, each song competing in the "Big Artists" section was performed again. Each performance was voted by a "Quality jury", composed of dancer Eleonora Abbagnato, TV author Gianni Boncompagni, TV presenters Giancarlo Magalli, Fabrizio Frizzi and Martina Colombari, journalists Emilio Fede and Tiziana Ferrario, actress Gloria Guida, writer and columnist Giampiero Mughini, and journalist Mariolina Simone. Public votes were also collected, and a final ranking was compiled, also combining the votes collected during the first and the second night. At the end of the night, Giò Di Tonno and Lola Ponce with the song "Colpo di fulmine" were announced the winners of the competition.

Performances

Guests and other performances
 Italian band Elio e le Storie Tese performed "Piano pianissimo", from Gioacchino Rossini's opera buffa The Barber of Seville.
 TV presenters Raimondo Vianello and Sandra Mondaini appeared during the night, receiving a prize awarded by the Italian Society of Authors and Publishers for their creativity.

Other awards

Critics Award "Mia Martini"

Big Artists section
The Critics' Award, entitled to Italians singer Mia Martini, was awarded by journalists following the contest, and was given to Tricarico for his entry "Vita tranquilla". Loredana Bertè's "Musica e parole", after being disqualified from the main competition, was declared ineligible for the Critics Award too.

Newcomers' section

Press, Radio & TV Award

Big Artists section

Big Artists section

Ratings

References

Sanremo Music Festival by year
2008 in Italian music
2008 song contests
2008 in Italian television